Mthimkhulu II (Also known as *Ngwadlazibomvu*) was King of the AmaHlubi people, a Bantu Kingdom from Southern Africa. He succeeded his father King Bhungane II,("Bhungan'omakhulukhulu") in the year  1801 and thus becoming the King of AmaHlubi nation to rule in what is now known as KwaZulu-Natal (South Africa) as the Kingdom can trace its lineage to  Great Lakes of Africa then later in the Lebombo mountains area. 

King Mthimkhulu 2nd from the Hlubi language "umuthi" means "tree" and "omkhulu" means "Great") hence "Mthimkhulu" means "Great Tree). He got this name because he had knowledge on kingship medicine and rainmaking of which neighboring Kingdoms consulted with him such as King Sobhuza I of Swazi and amaNgwena clan leader . In modern day his name is widely misunderstood to mean "Great tree" (Nb: a tree is called "isihlahla" in the Hlubi language.

In 1818 King Dingiswayo of( AbaThethwa Kingdom) attacked and looted the AmaNgwane clan whom, to replenish their losses of cattle,than attacked the Hlubi people. King Mthimkhulu II united with his brother from another Hlubi branch Prince Mpangazitha (Pakalita) and died in the ensuing battle in the year 1819.King Mthimkhulu's full brother Prince Marhwanqa assumed the regency on behalf of his son the heir to the AmaHlubi throne Prince Dlomo III who was still a minor at the time. When King Dlomo III ascended to the throne, he gathered his own troops and marched to the Zulu boarder where his own country and the Zulus meet and crossed into What was than called KwaZulu state country to fetch his uncle’s cattle which were kept in safety by the AmaZulu King Dingane kaSenzangakhona for the regent Prince Marhwanqa in the midst of his troubles with King Dlomo III who himself was claiming his rightful position from his uncle. His reign was however short lived as Dingane (a Zulu King) ordered the murder of the new Hlubi king which gave way for Langalibalele I to become the All New king of AmaHlubi nation.

External links 
 Genealogy
 
 House of Bhungane 
 
 http://www.mkhangelingoma.co.za/heritage/history.pdf

Bantu
19th-century monarchs in Africa
1778 births
1819 deaths
History of KwaZulu-Natal
Mfecane
Hlubi kings